Alexandr Stoianoglo (born 3 June 1967) is a Moldovan politician.

Biography 

He was a member of the Parliament of Moldova in 2009-2014 and has been Prosecutor General of Moldova since 2019. On 5 October 2021, he was arrested under allegations of corruption, and replaced by Dumitru Robu.

References

External links 
 

1967 births
Living people
People from Comrat
Gagauz people
Moldova State University alumni
Moldovan MPs 2009–2010
Democratic Party of Moldova MPs
Deputy Presidents of the Moldovan Parliament
Prosecutors general